The list of unnamed tropical cyclones since naming began includes all tropical cyclones that met the criteria for naming in a basin, but that for whatever reason, did not receive a name. These systems have occurred in all basins and for various reasons.

Scope, reasons, and naming overview

In order to ease communications and advisories, tropical cyclones are named when, according to the appropriate Regional Specialized Meteorological Center or Tropical Cyclone Warning Center, it has reached tropical storm status. A tropical cyclone with winds of tropical storm intensity or higher goes unnamed when operationally, it is not considered to have met the criteria for naming. Reasons for this include:

 Being missed during a season, usually because of uncertainties in classification in real time. An example of this is the 2005 Azores subtropical storm from the 2005 Atlantic hurricane season.
 Disagreements between warning centre and naming centres over intensity of a cyclone. An example of this is Tropical Storm 06W from the 1995 Pacific typhoon season.
 Formation of a cyclone in an area where no official agency is responsible for naming. An example of this is Tropical Cyclone 29P from the 1996–97 South Pacific cyclone season.
 Intentionally left unnamed to avoid confusion. An example of this is the 1991 Perfect Storm from the 1991 Atlantic hurricane season.
 Post-operational upgrading. An example of this is the Unnamed tropical storm from the 1996 Pacific hurricane season.

North Atlantic Ocean
Only unnamed subtropical cyclones that could have been named are included. This excludes several that existed, but that were unnamed because subtropical cyclones were not named when they existed.

Naming has been used since the 1950 season.

Tropical Storm 12 – 1950
Tropical Storm 15 – 1950
Tropical Storm 16 – 1950
Tropical Storm 1 – 1951
Hurricane 12 – 1951
Tropical Storm 1 – 1952
Tropical Storm 3 – 1952
Tropical Storm 5 – 1952
Tropical Storm 8 – 1952
Tropical Storm 11 – 1952
Tropical Storm 2 – 1953
Tropical Storm 5 – 1953
Tropical Storm 8 – 1953
Tropical Storm 11 – 1953
Tropical Storm 13 – 1953
Tropical Storm 1 – 1954
Tropical Storm 2 – 1954
Tropical Storm 4 – 1954
Tropical Storm 9 – 1954
Tropical Storm 11 – 1954
Hurricane 13 – 1954
Tropical Storm 15 – 1954
Tropical Storm 5 – 1955
Tropical Storm 11 – 1955
Tropical Storm 12 – 1955
Tropical Storm 1 – 1956
Tropical Storm 2 – 1956
Tropical Storm 9 – 1956
Tropical Storm 10 – 1956
Tropical Storm 12 – 1956
Tropical Storm 1 – 1957
Tropical Storm 8 – 1957
Tropical Storm 1 – 1958
Tropical Storm 12 – 1958
Hurricane 3 – 1959
Tropical Storm 6 – 1959
Tropical Storm 8 – 1959
Tropical Storm 9 – 1959
Tropical Storm 1 – 1960
Tropical Storm 6 – 1960
Tropical Storm 6 – 1961
Tropical Storm 1 – 1963
Tropical Storm 1 – 1964
Tropical Storm 2 – 1964
Tropical Storm 12 – 1964
Tropical Storm 1 – 1965
Hurricane 10 – 1969
Tropical Storm 11 – 1969
Tropical Storm 16 – 1969
Hurricane 17 – 1969
Tropical Storm 8 – 1970
Hurricane 18 – 1970
Hurricane 19 – 1970
Hurricane 2 – 1971
Tropical Storm 1 – 1987
Tropical Storm 7 – 1988
Hurricane 8 – 1991 – was deliberately left unnamed to avoid any confusion as the news media was focused, on the Perfect Storm and was expected to be short-lived and primarily of concern to maritime interests.
Subtropical Storm 19 – 2005
Tropical Storm 2 – 2006
Tropical Storm 12 – 2011 – advisories were not issued on this system during August/September 2011, because of the intermittent nature of the convection and the somewhat frontal nature of the satellite presentation.
Subtropical Storm 15 – 2013

South Atlantic Ocean

Naming began in 2011. Before 2011, a few systems in the south Atlantic basin were given names.

Tropical Storm 01Q – 2021 – was monitored and designated 01Q by NOAA, but not recognized by the Hydrographic Center of the Brazilian Navy, the organization responsible for naming tropical cyclones in the south Atlantic.

Eastern and central north Pacific Ocean

Naming began in 1960. Before 1957, a few systems in the central Pacific basin were given names, generally in an ad hoc manner.

Unnamed August tropical storm 1962 – This system was upgraded from a tropical depression to a tropical storm after a letter from a ship called the Golden State prompted a re evaluation of the system.
Unnamed tropical storm – 1963 – This system was not named or numbered as a tropical cyclone operationally, but has been recognized as an Unnamed tropical storm since.
Pacific Northwest hurricane – 1975  
Tropical Storm One-E – 1996 – Was upgraded from a tropical depression to a tropical storm after the United States Coast Guard relayed ship reports to the National Hurricane Center, that suggested the cyclone was a tropical storm.
 Tropical Storm Seven-E – 2020 – Was upgraded from a tropical depression to a tropical storm after European Space Agency's Advanced Scatterometer (ASCAT) suggested that the cyclone was a tropical storm.

Western north Pacific Ocean

The official practice of tropical cyclone naming started in 1945 within the Western Pacific. Due to differences in wind speed criteria between the Japan Meteorological Agency and the Joint Typhoon Warning Center, a system will sometimes be considered a tropical storm by the JTWC but only a depression by the JMA, or vice versa. This results in several apparent unnamed systems. Prior to 2000, the JTWC was responsible for tropical cyclone naming, with the JMA assuming responsibility for naming from 2000 and beyond. Due to this, "unnamed tropical cyclones" that met the JMA's tropical storm criteria but not those of the JTWC prior to 2000 are excluded. Likewise, "unnamed tropical cyclones" that met the JTWC's tropical storm criteria but not those of the JMA from 2000 and beyond are also excluded. 

 Tropical Storm 24W – 1948
 Tropical Storm 26W – 1948
 Tropical Storm 02W – 1950
 Tropical Storm 12W – 1952
 Tropical Storm 14W – 1952
 Tropical Storm 04W – 1953
 Tropical Storm 09W – 1953
 Tropical Storm 13W – 1953
 Tropical Storm 16W – 1953
 Tropical Storm 22W – 1953
 Tropical Storm 23W – 1953
 Tropical Storm 01W – 1954
 Tropical Storm 07W – 1954
 Tropical Storm 08W – 1954
 Tropical Storm 15W – 1954
 Tropical Storm 09W – 1955
 Tropical Storm 17W – 1955
 Tropical Storm 20W – 1955
 Tropical Storm 02W – 1956
 Tropical Storm 04W – 1956
 Tropical Storm 08W – 1956
 Tropical Storm 18W – 1956
 Tropical Storm 01W – 1957
 Tropical Storm 08W – 1957
 Tropical Storm 17W – 1957
 Tropical Storm 06W – 1995
 Tropical Storm 24W – 1996 – was operationally classified as a depression by both the JTWC and PAGASA, the latter of which named the system Ningning. However, it was later determined by JTWC that the system reached tropical storm intensity.
 Tropical Storm 35W – 1996
 Tropical Storm 38W – 1996
 Tropical Storm 03W – 1998

North Indian Ocean
Due to differences in wind speed criteria between the India Meteorological Department and the Joint Typhoon Warning Center, a system will sometimes be considered a tropical storm by the JTWC but only a depression by the IMD. This results in several apparent unnamed systems. Because the IMD is responsible for naming, "unnamed tropical cyclones" that met the JTWC's tropical storm criteria but not those of the IMD are excluded.

Naming has taken place since mid-2003.

There have been no unnamed tropical cyclones using the India Meteorological Department's criteria. One system, 2007's Yemyin, was upgraded after the fact and retroactively named.

South-west Indian Ocean

Tropical cyclones have been named within this basin since 1960, with any tropical depression or subtropical depression that RSMC La Réunion analyze as having 10-minute sustained windspeeds of at least 65 km/h, 40 mph is named. However unlike other basins RSMC La Réunion do not name tropical depressions, however as they delegate the rights to name tropical cyclones to the Subregional tropical cyclone warning centers in Mauritius or Madagascar depending on whether it is east or west of the 55th meridian east.

Moderate Tropical Storm F1 – 1998–99
Subtropical Depression 13 – 1999–2000
Subtropical Depression 15 – 2000–01

 Subtropical Depression 15 – 2006–07

Tropical Cyclone 01U – 2007–08
Subtropical Depression 10 – 2009–10
Subtropical Depression 09 – 2010–11
Subtropical Depression 13 – 2013–14
Moderate Tropical Storm 01 – 2018–19
Moderate Tropical Storm 08 – 2021–22

Australian region

Cyclone 5 – 1964–65
Cyclone 6 – 1964–65
Cyclone 6 – 1965–66
Cyclone 9 – 1965–66
Cyclone 2 – 1967–68
Cyclone 3 – 1967–68
Cyclone 11 – 1967–68
Cyclone 13 – 1967–68
Cyclone 17 – 1967–68
Cyclone 15 – 1968–69
Cyclone 16 – 1968–69
Cyclone 1 – 1969–70
Cyclone 7 – 1969–70
Flores Cyclone - 1972-73
Cyclone 2 – 1981–82
Cyclone 6 – 1983–84
Cyclone 8 – 1995–96
Cyclone 1 – 2002–03
Tropical Cyclone 01U – 2007–08 
Tropical Cyclone 25U – 2010–11
Tropical Cyclone 22U – 2016–17
Tropical Cyclone 01U – 2022–23

South Pacific
Unnamed Tropical Cyclone 1971–72 – December 1971
Unnamed Tropical Cyclone 1971–72 – January 1972
Unnamed Tropical Cyclone 1973–74 – November 1973
Unnamed Tropical Cyclone 1976–77 – February 1977 (1)
Unnamed Tropical Cyclone 1976–77 – February 1977 (2)
Unnamed Tropical Cyclone 1980–81 – February 1981
Unnamed Tropical Cyclone 1980–81 – February/March 1981
Unnamed Tropical Cyclone 1980–81 – March 1981
Unnamed Tropical Cyclone 1983–84 – February 1984
Unnamed Tropical Cyclone 1983–84 – March 1984
Unnamed Tropical Cyclone 1984–85 – December 1985
Unnamed Tropical Cyclone 1986–87 – March 1987
Unnamed Tropical Cyclone 1988–89 – February 1989
Unnamed tropical cyclone 1990–91 – December 1990
Tropical Cyclone 29P could not be named during February 1997 as it had developed into a tropical cyclone within the subtropic region of the Southern Pacific.

References

Unless otherwise indicated, all storms come from the following datasets from the Regional Specialized Meteorological Center:
Atlantic: 
Western north Pacific: 
Northern Indian, western north Pacific, Southern Hemisphere: 
Southwestern Indian Ocean:

External links
 Unisys Weather Data

Unnamed